Simon Pitschieler (born 3 December 1997) is an Italian ice hockey player for HC Bozen–Bolzano and the Italian national team.

He represented Italy at the 2021 IIHF World Championship.

References

External links

1997 births
Living people
Bolzano HC players
HC Gardena players
Italian ice hockey centres
Ice hockey people from Bolzano